Transport Workers Union may refer to:
 Transport Workers Union of America, active in the United States
 Transport Workers Union of Australia
 Transport Workers' Union (Netherlands), former Dutch trade union
 Transport Workers' Union NKV, former Catholic trade union in the Netherlands
 Transport Workers' Union NVV, former social democratic trade union in the Netherlands
 Swedish Transport Workers' Union

See also
 Maharashtra Sugarcane Cutting and Transport Workers Union
 South African Transport and Allied Workers Union
 Transport and General Workers' Union (disambiguation), various unions
 Transport and Industrial Workers Union, active in Trinidad and Tobago